Evan Mock is an American model, actor, and skateboarder. He is known for starring in the HBO Max series Gossip Girl.

Life and career 
Evan Mock was born in Waimea Bay on Oahu in Hawaii. His mother is Filipino, while his father is American and a surfboard fin maker. Mock was homeschooled. Growing up, he aspired to be a professional surfer or skater. Mock relocated to California at age 18 to professionally skateboard. He rose to prominence after singer Frank Ocean posted a video of him skating.

Mock modeled in fashion shows for the brands Louis Vuitton and 1017 Alyx 9SM and launched a clothing line called Sorry in Advance in 2019. He then appeared in advertisements for fragrances by the retailer the Aldo Group and fashion designer Paco Rabanne. Mock starred in a modeling campaign for a clothing collection by fashion designer Giuseppe Zanotti the following year. In June 2021, he launched a collection with the clothing company RVCA. Mock starred as private school student Akeno "Aki" Menzies in the teen drama television series Gossip Girl, which premiered on HBO Max in July 2021. The series marked his first acting role. Its creator Joshua Safran created the part for Mock to portray.

Personal life 
Mock splits his time between Oahu and New York City. Despite playing a character who explores his sexuality on Gossip Girl, Mock is heterosexual. His pink hair has been regarded as his signature look.

Filmography

References

External links 
 

Living people
21st-century American male actors
American male actors of Filipino descent
American male models
American skateboarders
People from Oahu
1997 births